Air Philippines Corporation, operating as PAL Express and formerly branded as Air Philippines and Airphil Express, is a wholly owned subsidiary airline of Philippine Airlines which is under its ownership. It is PAL's regional brand, with services from its hubs in Manila, Clark, Cebu, and Davao.

The airline has been re-branded a number of times, first as Air Philippines, then Airphil Express, and is now known as PAL Express. After a series of financial losses, Air Philippines ceased operations until it was acquired by investors from Philippine Airlines. After the acquisition, the airline was re-launched as PAL Express, operating some routes and slot assignments of its sister company Philippine Airlines until its management decided to re-brand the carrier as a budget airline known as Airphil Express. However, in March 2013, the airline name was reverted to PAL Express. As a codeshare partner of Philippine Airlines, PAL Express operates as a full service carrier within a low-cost model.

PAL Express is Philippine Airlines' answer to Cebu Pacific's dominance in the low-cost travel market in the Philippines. It has allowed PAL to focus on the premium market, where PAL does not have competition among other airlines. PAL Express gained a significant increase in passengers following its launch as a low-cost carrier. The airline is currently in fleet acquisition mode to support its regional route expansion plan.

History

Beginnings as Air Philippines (1995–1999) 

Air Philippines was incorporated on February 13, 1995, with its hub at Subic Bay International Airport. Flight operations started on February 1, 1996, with a Boeing 737-200 between Subic Bay, Iloilo, and Zamboanga. In 1996, six NAMC YS-11 and four Boeing 737-200 aircraft were acquired by the company. In 1997, an additional one Boeing 737-200 was acquired. In this same year, the airline carried over 675,000 passengers and over 773,000 in 1998. In September 1998, the airline was temporarily grounded by the Air Transportation Office (ATO), the forerunner to the Civil Aviation Authority of the Philippines (CAAP).

Lucio Tan Group takeover (1999–2008) 
It was in 1999 when Lucio Tan Group took over management of the airline. In March 1999, Air Philippines was granted approval to operate international services to Hong Kong, Japan, South Korea, Taiwan, and the USA. In May 2001, two Boeing 737-300 aircraft were delivered. In mid-2002, charter flights were started from Subic Bay and Laoag to Hong Kong. Passenger numbers carried rose to nearly 881,000 in 2002. In July 2004, charter flights started from Subic Bay to Guangzhou.

Air Philippines significantly increased ties with Philippine Airlines (PAL), including the merging of frequent flier plans, timetables, and ticket sales. Air Philippines also moved into the PAL terminal at Ninoy Aquino International Airport (Manila). Some of PAL's major stock owners are also owners of Air Philippines. Air Philippines officially ceased to be part of Philippine Airlines' frequent flier program, "Mabuhay Miles", on October 1, 2007. Air Philippines has said that they chose to back out of the Mabuhay Miles program to benefit their passengers, so rather than flying numerous flights to gain miles and wait to a certain point to receive bonuses, passengers can benefit with lower fares and more discounts with quicker bonuses, much more like today's modern-day low-cost airline.

PAL Express launch (2008–2010)

On April 10, 2008, Philippine Airlines announced an order for aircraft for the PAL Express fleet. It consisted of aircraft from the Bombardier Q family, including three from the Q300 series and six from the Q400 series, manufactured by Bombardier Aerospace in a deal valued at $150 million.  PAL announced on April 13 that the new fleet would be based mainly in Cebu to serve regional routes, while flights from Manila would also be launched.

PAL Express was unveiled on April 14, 2008. The airline primarily flies intra-regional routes from its Cebu hub to the Visayas and Mindanao islands, as well as secondary routes to smaller airports in island provinces that are not able to accommodate PAL's mainline jet aircraft. On May 5, 2008, PAL Express began operations by launching flights to Caticlan. The airline then announced that it would serve 22 inter-island routes, including some provincial points that lacked air service. Flights out of Cebu commenced on May 19, 2008. After Air Philippines ceased operations in 2009, they transferred all their flights to PAL Express.

PAL Express ceased operations on March 28, 2010, and transferred all of its flights to the then-newly launched Airphil Express.

Airphil Express rebranding (2010–2012)

Air Philippines was rebranded as Airphil Express on March 28, 2010. The airline restored jet service to Iloilo, Bacolod, Puerto Princesa and Cagayan de Oro, utilizing Airbus A320 aircraft. The airline subsequently operated eight Bombardier Q300 and Q400 turboprop aircraft and two Airbus A320s, all of which were former Philippine Airlines aircraft.

On the day of the re-launch, the airline announced the acquisition of 20 A320s. In January and early February 2012, GE Capital Aviation Services Limited (GECAS) announced the delivery of three new Airbus A320 aircraft to Airphil Express to help the carrier expand its fleet.

During its time, Airphil Express was regarded as the fastest-growing low-cost airline in the Philippines. In 2011, it had a 19% market share in the Philippine aviation market. Its destinations and route network continued to expand as its fleet expanded.

PAL Express revival (2013–present)
In August 2012, Philippine Airlines announced the rebranding of Airphil Express as PAL Express. The rebranding took effect on March 15, 2013, while maintaining its business name as Air Philippines Corporation.

PAL Express began carrying the brand name Philippine Airlines through a cooperative agreement with PAL. This strategy is intended to harmonize the two carriers in order to make them more competitive, ensure leadership and superior core services, and enhance the efficiency and profitability of both carriers. As PAL continued to expand its code-sharing agreement with PAL Express, PAL transferred most of its domestic flights to PAL Express by August 1, 2013.

In 2016, the airline signed a letter of intent with Bombardier for orders of up to 12 Bombardier Dash 8-Q400 aircraft in a two-class 86-seat configuration. On December 16, 2016, PAL Express began its Caticlan, Busuanga and Basco services from its Clark hub. These alternate route operations were launched to decongest traffic on their Manila hub.

Destinations

Fleet

Current fleet
, PAL Express operates the following aircraft:

Former fleet

Incidents and accidents

On June 24, 1996, an Air Philippines YS-11 struck a ground power unit while taxiing at Naga Airport (WNP). The aircraft caught fire. There were no fatalities among the 34 aircraft occupants.
On April 19, 2000, a Boeing 737-200 jet operating as Air Philippines Flight 541 from Manila to Davao crashed before the approach at Francisco Bangoy International Airport. 124 passengers, and 7 crew were killed. It was the deadliest accident of the airline and the worst aviation disaster in Philippine aviation history.
On August 11, 2008, a Bombardier DHC-8 Q400 aircraft operating as Airphil Express Flight 29 with 75 passengers and 3 crew safely landed on runway 04 at Catarman Airport when the airplane's nose wheel struck a soft spot in the runway's surface while taxiing, the airline reported. No injuries were reported.
On November 15, 2008, a Bombardier DHC-8 Q400 operating as Airphil Express Flight 272 made an emergency landing at its destination, Davao International Airport, from Zamboanga International Airport due to a problem with the plane's left landing gear. No one onboard was injured and the aircraft landed safely.
On February 13, 2012, an Airbus A320 operating as Airphil Express Flight 969 with 135 people on board overshot the runway at Kalibo International Airport, Kalibo, Aklan. No injuries or aircraft damage occurred in the incident.
On April 23, 2012, a Bombardier DHC-8 Q400 operating as Airphil Express Flight 285 from Zamboanga City to Tawi-Tawi was aborted as smoke emitted from the right turboprop engine of the plane. The plane was about to take off when pilots noticed the smoke, prompting them to return to the ramp and to order 50 passengers to disembark shortly after 7:00 in the morning. There were no injuries reported.
On December 10, 2021, a Bombardier DHC-8 Q400 operating as Philippine Airlines Flight PR2369, originating from Caticlan, skidded off the runway at Mactan–Cebu International Airport shortly after landing.

References

External links

Philippine Airlines
Airlines of the Philippines
Airlines formerly banned in the European Union
Companies based in Pasay
Philippine companies established in 1995
Airlines established in 1995